Eupithecia furvipennis is a moth in the  family Geometridae. It is found in Argentina.

References

Moths described in 1906
furvipennis
Moths of South America